Mutations is a studio album by American jazz pianist Vijay Iyer recorded in 2013 and released on the ECM label in 2014.

Reception

The Allmusic review by Thom Jurek awarded the album 4½ stars out of 5, stating "Mutations rewards with well-considered, inspired performances". Writing for All About Jazz, John Kelman said "Mutations is a landmark recording from an artist who, while already possessing an admirable discography, has clearly been limited to more decidedly jazz-oriented concerns. Representing a significant musical shift, if Mutations is but the first sign of the greater freedom ECM plans to afford Iyer, the only vaticinator of what's to follow will surely be its complete and utter unpredictability". The Guardian review by John Fordham awarded the album 4 stars noting "It's thoughtful, typically original, and unexpectedly very exciting". Rob Shepherd, writing for PostGenre, noted "Vijay Iyer’s first for ECM is also arguably his best [to date]. While his previous releases showcased a supremely talented pianist, it appears that signing with the Munich based label opened a number of doors creatively for him."

Not all reviews were as enthusiastic, with JazzTimes stating that Mutations is a major disappointment. The problem is Iyer's writing for strings. There is a 10-part suite for string quartet, piano and electronics. The suite is stunningly devoid of the aesthetic and emotional content that makes most people listen to music. Qualities such as lyric discovery, melodic fulfillment and rhythmic engagement are absent".

Track listing
All compositions by Vijay Iyer
 "Spellbound and Sacrosanct, Cowrie Shells and the Shimmering Sea" - 7:39   
 "Vuln, Part 2" - 4:34  
 "Mutation 1: Air" - 4:12   
 "Mutation 2: Rise" - 2:44   
 "Mutation 3: Canon" - 5:47   
 "Mutation 4: Chain" - 5:25
 "Mutation 5: Automata" - 6:32
 "Mutation 6: Waves" - 3:00   
 "Mutation 7: Kernel" - 5:59   
 "Mutation 8: Clade" - 1:34   
 "Mutation 9: Descent" - 5:17   
 "Mutation 10: Time" - 4:00   
 "When We're Gone" - 3:30

Personnel
 Vijay Iyer — piano, electronics
Michi Wiancko, Miranda Cuckson — violin (tracks 3-12)
Kyle Armbrust — viola (tracks 3-12)
Kivie Cahn-Lipman — cello (tracks 3-12)

References

2014 albums
Vijay Iyer albums
ECM Records albums
Albums produced by Manfred Eicher
Instrumental albums